James S. Forrester may refer to:

 James Forrester (politician) (James Summers Forrester, 1937–2011), member of the North Carolina General Assembly
 James S. Forrester (cardiologist) (born 1937), American cardiologist